The Tollens-Fonds ("Tollens foundation)" is a Dutch organization named for poet Hendrik Tollens (1780–1856). The organization awards a notable literary prize, the Tollens Prize and till 2008 also the Jacobson Prize.

Tollens Prize
The Tollens Prize is a quinquennial award in the Netherlands designed to provide a five prominent literary honor. The prize is awarded for a body of work that, in the opinion of the jury, had the highest literary value in the preceding five years.

The award, established by the Board of Tollensfonds in 1902, is called the Tollensprijs since 1925. It was named after the poet Hendrik Tollens (1780–1856).

Winners
2015 - Hans Dorrestijn
2010 - Paulien Cornelisse
2005 - Jules Deelder
2000 - Heinz Hermann Polzer (Drs. P)
1992 - Marten Toonder
1988 - Koos Schuur
1983 - Belcampo
1978 - Michel van der Plas
1973 - Anton Koolhaas
1968 - F.C. Terborgh
1963 - Ina Boudier-Bakker
1958 - Maria Dermoût
1953 - Bertus Aafjes
1948 - H.W.J.M. Keuls
1943 - J.W.F. Werumeus Buning
1938 - Herman de Man
1933 - Arthur van Schendel
1928 - R. van Genderen Stort
1923 - Louis Couperus
1918 - Willem Kloos
1918 - Jacobus van Looy
1913 - P.C. Boutens
1913 - Lodewijk van Deyssel
1908 - Carel Scharten and Margo Scharten-Antink
1903 - G. van Hulzen

Jacobson award
Named for Jos. Jacobson, this award is given every three years to an "elderly" writer or critic, often for their entire oeuvre.

Winners
2008 - Carel Peeters
2002 - S. Dresden
1992 - Elisabeth Augustin
1990 - Jan de Hartog
1985 - Han G. Hoekstra
1985 - Eric van der Steen
1980 - Henriëtte van Eyk
1980 - Jeanne van Schaik-Willing
1975 - Annie Solomons
1975 - J. C. van Schagen
1970 - Willem Brandt
1965 - Elisabeth Zernike
1960 - Marie Schmitz
1955 - Kees van Bruggen
1950 - J. van Oudshoorn
1945 - Frans Bastiaanse
1940 - G. van Hulzen
1940 - J. K. Rensburg 
1935 - Maurits Wagenvoort
1930 - F. Smit Kleine
1925 - Nine van der Schaaf

References

External links
List of winners

Dutch literary awards
Foundations based in the Netherlands